In Roman mythology, Pilumnus ("staker") was a nature deity, brother of Picumnus.  He ensured children grew properly and stayed healthy.  Ancient Romans made an extra bed after the birth of a child in order to ensure the help of Pilumnus.  He also taught humanity how to grind grain.  He was also sometimes identified as the husband of Danaë, and therefore the father of Danaus and the ancestor of Turnus.

A ceremony to honour the deity involved driving a stake into the ground.

References 
 Michael Jordan, Encyclopedia of Gods, Kyle Cathie Limited, 2002
Google Books - The Cult of Silvanus: A Study in Roman Folk Religion

Health gods
Nature gods
Roman gods
Childhood gods
Agricultural gods